The FE-10 (abbreviated from the Spanish: Férreo Español 2010) is a steel-wheeled model of electrical multiple units used on the Mexico City Metro, first used in 2012 and currently servicing Line 12.

Conception
In 2009, while Mexico City Metro Line 12 was still under construction, Spanish Construcciones y Auxiliar de Ferrocarriles (CAF) was awarded the contract to supply 30 trains of seven cars each for Line 12 for an approximate amount of 1 billion euros.

CAF had previously supplied trains for the Mexico City Metro such as the NE-92 and NM-02.

Description
The FE–10 currently services Line 12 only. Each train is equipped with vehicle control and monitoring system, ATP-ATO automatic driving system, passenger information and video entertainment systems, CCTV, and saloon and cab ventilation systems.

In 2015, Technischer Überwachungsverein made a recommendation to STC to change the trains due to certification problems that mainly affect an excessive wear for the steel wheels and the rails.

Technical specifications
Train length: 
Overall width: 
Height of a train car above the running surface: 
Floor height above the running surface: 
Weight in running order: 
Maximum capacity (at four travelers / m2): 700 passengers including 144 seats
Folding seats available off-peak: 146
Maximum speed: 
Maximum power: 
Average acceleration of 
Maximum braking normal steady state:

Train names
Out of the 30 trains in service, nine of them have been named, honoring several prominent Mexican people from the 20th century.

References

Mexico City Metro rolling stock
1500 V DC multiple units
Rolling stock of Mexico